Louis Henry Strean was an Irish Anglican priest.

Strean was born in County Roscommon and educated at Trinity College, Dublin. He was   Archdeacon of Elphin from 1845 to 1847.

References 

Archdeacons of Elphin
Alumni of Trinity College Dublin
People from County Waterford
19th-century Irish Anglican priests